The Guam rail (Hypotaenidia owstoni) is a species of flightless bird, endemic to the United States territory of Guam, where it is known locally as the Ko'ko' bird. The Guam rail disappeared from southern Guam in the early 1970s and was extirpated from the entire island by the late 1980s.  This species is now being bred in captivity by the Division of Aquatic and Wildlife Resources on Guam and at some mainland U.S. zoos.  Since 1995, more than 100 rails have been introduced on the island of Rota in the Commonwealth of the Northern Mariana Islands in an attempt to establish a wild breeding colony.  Although at least one chick resulted from these efforts, feral cat predation and accidental deaths have been extremely high. In 2010, 16 birds were released onto Cocos Island, with 12 more being introduced in 2012.  In 2019, the species became only the second bird after the California condor to be reclassified by the IUCN from extinct in the wild to critically endangered.

Background

Nine of the eleven species of native forest-dwelling birds have been extirpated from Guam.  Five of these were endemic at the species or subspecies level and are now extinct on Guam. Two of these species, the Guam rail and the Guam kingfisher, are being captively bred in zoos in the hope that they can eventually be released back into the wild.  Several other native species exist in precariously small numbers, and their future on Guam is perilous. Most native forest species, including the Guam rail, were virtually extinct when they were listed as threatened or endangered by the U.S. Fish and Wildlife Service in 1984.

Description

It is a medium-sized rail about 11 inches (28 cm) in total length. The body is elongated and laterally compressed, particularly in the neck and breast regions, allowing the birds to move rapidly through dense vegetation.  The plumage or feather color and pattern of both sexes is similar, however males can often be distinguished by their larger size.  The head and back are brown.  It has a grey eye stripe and throat, a dark blackish breast with white barring, and the legs and beak are dark brown.

Behavior and habitat
The Guam rail is a secretive, flightless, territorial species that is most easily observed as it bathes or feeds along roadsides or field edges. The call is a loud, piercing whistle or series of whistles, usually given by two or more birds in response to a loud noise, the call of another rail, or other disturbances. Though individuals will respond almost invariably to the call of another rail, the species is generally silent. It is one of the few native birds of Guam that was found more frequently in scrubby second growth or mixed forest than in uniform tracts of mature forest.

It is a year-round ground nester making it highly susceptible to predators, such as the native Mariana monitor and introduced rats. It lays 2–4 eggs and both parents share in the construction of a shallow nest of leaves and grass. They mature at six months of age and have been known to produce up to 10 clutches per year in captivity.

The species is omnivorous but appears to prefer animals over vegetable food. It is known to eat gastropods, skinks, geckos, insects, and carrion as well as seeds and palm leaves.

Threats

The Guam rail was once abundant with estimated population to be around 70,000 before the 1960s. It evolved in the absence of predators such as snakes and rats and might have been more abundant before American colonization. After the end of World War II, the brown tree snake was accidentally transported from its native range in Papua New Guinea to Guam, probably as a stowaway in military ship cargo. Beginning in the 1960s, the snake became well established as numbers began to grow exponentially and the rail populations plummeted along with the rest of Guam's native avifauna. The Guam rail had no experience with such a predator and lacked protective behaviors against the snake.  Consequently, it was an easy prey for this efficient, nocturnal predator.

Appreciable losses of the Guam rail was not evident until the mid 1960s.  By 1963, several formerly abundant rails had disappeared from the central part of the island where snakes were most populous.  By the late 1960s, it had begun to decline in the central and southern parts of the island and remained abundant only in isolated patches of forest on the northern end of the island.  Snakes began affecting the rail in the north-central and extreme northern parts of the island in the 1970s and 1980s, respectively. The population declined severely from 1969 to 1973 and continued to decline until the mid 1980s. It was last seen in the wild in 1987. Other significant threats to the rail include habitat destruction, predation by introduced rats, feral cats, pigs and Mangrove monitor lizards.

Conservation efforts

Zoologist Bob Beck, a Guam Department of Agriculture Division of Aquatic and Wildlife Resources wildlife supervisor, is credited with leading the efforts to capture the remaining wild Guam rails, Guam kingfishers and other native birds to save them from extinction. His efforts to save the Guam rail began in 1982 and lasted more than 20 years. Beck was considered to be instrumental in capturing the remaining population of Guam rails and establishing captive breeding programs for the species on Guam. He later established a release site and an introduced breeding population of Guam rails on the neighboring island of Rota in the Northern Mariana Islands.

Beck was also a driving force in establishing Guam rail breeding programs in zoos throughout the mainland United States. Beck's Guam rail breeding program initially began with just three zoos in the U.S. – the Bronx Zoo, the Philadelphia Zoo and the National Zoo in Washington, D.C. The program proved to be successful and was soon expanded to include other zoos.  Seventeen zoos now participate in the Guam rail breeding program, as of 2008, including the Audubon Zoo in New Orleans, the San Diego Zoo, the Santa Fe College Teaching Zoo, and zoos in Chicago, Houston and San Antonio.

The efforts by Beck, and others, to save the Guam rail have been promising.  There are now approximately 120 Guam rails in captivity in Guam and approximately 35 birds in captive breeding programs throughout the United States. Biologist Gary Wiles, who worked on the Guam rail breeding program from 1981 through 2000, said of Beck's efforts to save the Guam rail, "Bob was one of the first to begin organizing catching the birds so they could be brought into captivity, held there and bred. He started a captive population. We still have Guam rails today because of his efforts." Suzanne Medina, a wildlife biologist, also credited Beck with saving the Guam rail, "Bob Beck was the ko'ko' champion, was Guam's champion at the time for preventing the extinction of these birds."

A recent effort to introduce rails on Guam in a 22 hectare forested area concentrated on protecting the rails by limiting snakes using a combination of trapping and a perimeter barrier to reduce re-invasion by snakes.  This endeavor allowed the tentative survival of several pairs of rails released into the area.  Reproduction by the rails was reported in this control area on the basis of sounds attributed to chicks.  The preliminary success constitutes one of the few bright spots in the conservation of Guam's native fauna in recent years and speaks to future opportunities to recover wildlife.

In November 2010, 16 Guam rails were released on Cocos Island, a 33 hectare small atoll 1 mile off the coast of the southern tip of Guam as part of its reintroduction two decades after its extinction in the wild. It was an effort to provide safe nesting areas for the rails, as well as a place for the public to see them in the wild. Before the reintroduction, rats were eradicated off the island and the forest was further enhanced with native trees. A native lizard survey was conducted to make sure that the rails had enough food to eat. Monitor lizard populations were reduced to minimize their impacts of the newly released rails. The reintroduction proved to be successful as evidence of breeding have been observed. This will provide a model environment to develop strategies for future reintroductions as well as expertise in rodent and snake detection, eradication, and bio-security measures.

References

External links 
 BirdLife Species Factsheet
 USGS: Extinctions and Loss of Species from Guam: Birds

Hypotaenidia
Flightless birds
Birds of Guam
ESA endangered species
Birds described in 1895
Taxa named by Walter Rothschild
Critically endangered fauna of the United States